Raja Lalitkumar Singh (1924–2000) was the last official ruler of princely state of Raigarh State. He ascended the throne in 1947 upon death of his father Raja Chakradhar Singh and acceded his State into Union of India on 1 January 1948. He later got elected and became Member of Legislative Assembly from Gharghonda as a candidate of Indian National Congress in 1952–57. He next time got elected from Chargoda in 1957–62. After abolition of privy purse, he was left with meager resources and sold most of his assets. In 1980, he tried his luck in politics again stood for election but was defeated. He lived his last years as pauper, living in hut outside town on borrowed money. He died in 2000.

See also
 Surendra Kumar Singh

References

1924 births
2000 deaths
Rajas of Raigarh
Madhya Pradesh MLAs 1952–1957
Madhya Pradesh MLAs 1957–1962
Indian National Congress politicians from Chhattisgarh